Members of the New South Wales Legislative Council who served between April 1934 and April 1937 were elected in 1933 or at a by-election. Prior to 1934 members had been appointed for life by the Governor on the advice of the Executive Council. This was the first occasion in which members had been elected, not directly by the people, but by a joint sitting of the New South Wales Parliament with members having a 12 year term. Being the first election, the members were elected in four groups of 15 members, for terms ending in 1937, 1940, 1943 and 1946. The President was Sir John Peden.

See also
First Stevens ministry
Second Stevens Ministry

References

Members of New South Wales parliaments by term
20th-century Australian politicians